Prince Vaali is a 2014 Hollywood superhero action film written by and directed by Vishnu Tanay.

Prince Vaali  released on April 25, 2014 .

Plot summary

A technologically advanced race from a far away constellation arrives on ancient Earth to gain supremacy. To maintain control over mother Earth, the twelve mighty tribes - Garuda, Gandharva, Yaksha, Kinnera, Kimpurusha, Naga, Vanara, Vidhyadhara, Valikilya, Deva, Pisacha and Rakshasa - ruling different parts of ancient Earth must unite under the leadership 
of the recluse and arrogant demi-god Vaali.

Cast
Shiva Thejus as Vaali
Daiana Menezes

Production
A super suit for the lead actor has been manufactured by Renegade Effects Group and is reportedly one of the most expensive suits in World Cinema. Top actors and actresses of Latin America have been hired to play important characters. Reputed Hollywood stunt choreographer James Lew is directing the action sequences of the film.

External links

References

2014 films
Films shot in Los Angeles
Indian action films
2014 action films
2010s Indian superhero films

Indian superhero films